The WCHA Most Outstanding Player in Tournament was an annual award given out at the conclusion of the WCHA tournament to the best player in the championship as voted by the head coaches of each member team.

The Tournament MVP was first awarded in 1988 and every year thereafter. The award was changed from 'most valuable' to 'most outstanding' for the 2017 tournament.

Bill Pye is the only player to have won the award more than once. Additionally, two recipients have received the honor while not playing for the conference champion.

Award winners

Note: * recipient not on championship team

Winners by school

Winners by position

See also
WCHA Awards

References

Citations

Sources

External links
WCHA Awards (Incomplete)

College ice hockey trophies and awards in the United States